Dargalu is a former name of Aygezard, a town in the Ararat Province of Armenia.

Dargalu or Darghalu may also refer to:

 Dargalu Verkhniy, Ararat Province, Armenia
 Darghalu, West Azerbaijan Province, Iran